Heather Trost (born July 18, 1982) is an American violinist and singer.

Biography
Trost was born in Albuquerque, New Mexico, and is one of the two members of the American Balkan Folk band A Hawk and a Hacksaw, with husband Jeremy Barnes (of Neutral Milk Hotel).

Trost and Barnes also worked together in the band Beirut, having been recruited by Zach Condon to help him complete the recording of his first album Gulag Orkestar (2006).

She is a former member of the band FOMA.

Discography

Solo
 Ouroboros (2015)
 Agistri (2017)
 Petrichor (2020)
 Desert Flowers  (2022)

A Hawk and a Hacksaw
 Darkness at Noon (2005) – Violin, Vocals
 The Way the Wind Blows (2006) – Viola, Violin
 A Hawk and a Hacksaw and the Hun Hangár Ensemble (2007) – Viola, Violin, Cello
 Délivrance (2009) – Viola, Violin, Accordion, Vocals 
 Cervantine (2011) – Viola, Violin
 You Have Already Gone to the Other World (2013)
 Forest Bathing (2018)

Other artists
 Beirut : Gulag Orkestar (2006) – Violin
 Beirut : The Flying Club Cup (2007) – Viola, Violin
 Benjamin Wetherill : Laura (2008) – Violin, Viola
Josephine Foster : Bloodrushing (2012)
 Thor & Friends : Thor & Friends (2016)
 Thor & Friends : The Subversive Nature of Kindness (2017)
 Swans : Leaving Meaning (2019)

References

1982 births
Living people
Musicians from Albuquerque, New Mexico
American violinists
21st-century violinists
Beirut (band) members
A Hawk and a Hacksaw members